The beaded darter (Etheostoma clinton) is a species of freshwater ray-finned fish, a darter from the subfamily Etheostomatinae, part of the family Percidae, which also contains the perches, ruffes and pikeperches. It is found in the upper Caddo and upper Ouachita Rivers upstream of the fall line in the Ouachita Mountains of Arkansas.

It was named after the 42nd president of the United States Bill Clinton for his lasting environmental accomplishments in creating and expanding national monuments, preserving millions of acres of wilderness areas, his leadership and commitment during challenging economic times, and his continued commitment to global humanitarian issues and needs and peace.

See also
 List of organisms named after famous people (born 1900–1949)

References

Freshwater fish of the United States
Etheostoma
Fish described in 2012
Taxa named by Steven R. Layman
Taxa named by Richard L. Mayden